Kjetil André Rekdal (born 6 November 1968) is a Norwegian football manager and a former player. He is the manager of Eliteserien club Rosenborg.

Rekdal began his playing career in Molde FK, playing afterwards for clubs in the Bundesliga, Ligue 1 and Belgian Pro League. Playing as a midfielder during his time as a player, his 83 caps with the Norway national team makes him the seventh most capped player in the team's history.

Rekdal previously managed Vålerenga from 2000 to 2006, during which he won both the cup and league title. He has also been in charge of 1. FC Kaiserslautern, Lierse and Aalesund. During his time at Aalesund, the club earned two cup titles and saw a period of success previously unmatched in their history, which was attributed to Rekdal.

Club career
Born in Molde, Rekdal started playing football for the local club Fiksdal/Rekdal in 1979. Later as a 16-year-old he started his professional career with the local top flight club Molde FK, becoming the second-youngest player in the league. In 1988, he signed with the Bundesliga club Borussia Mönchengladbach and stayed with them for two years before moving to the Belgian Pro League side Lierse S.K. and remaining there until 1996, with the exception of the 1994 season which he spent on loan helping his former club Molde FK gaining promotion to Tippeligaen and winning the domestic Cup.

In 1996, he signed for Ligue 1 club Rennes. The highlight of his playing career was a highly successful spell at Hertha BSC in Germany between 1997 and 2000. His final years as a player and then player/manager was spent in Norwegian club Vålerenga, where he picked up another cup winner's medal in 2002 before retiring in 2004. In the summer of 2007, Rekdal officially rejoined his youth club Fiksdal/Rekdal.

International career
Rekdal has 83 games for the Norway national team, after his debut against Italy in 1987, and played in two FIFA World Cups (1994 and 1998). He scored 17 goals for the national team, among those a long-range goal at Wembley against England in 1992, the only goal in the game as Norway beat Mexico in the 1994 World Cup, and a penalty in the 1998 World Cup against Brazil to win the game 2–1, prompting the commentator to say how "the man with the yellow boots has hurt those wearing the yellow shirts...Delight for Egil Olsen". The two World Cup goals make him the highest scoring Norwegian in World Cup history, with one goal more than Arne Brustad, Dan Eggen, Håvard Flo and Tore André Flo.

Coaching career

Vålerenga
Rekdal has proven himself a successful coach, leading Vålerenga from relegation in 2001, and famously weeping as his team avoided relegation the following year and back into position as one of the dominating clubs in the Tippeligaen. In 2004, he led the team to second place, losing the first place on goal difference to Rosenborg, and in 2005, his team finally won the league for the first time in 21 years, ending Rosenborg's 13-year reign as champions of Norway. along the way receiving legend-status in the club, partly due to the fact that he refused an offer of a six-digit coaching salary in order to help the club financially.

Lierse
Rekdal resigned as coach at Vålerenga on 21 August 2006, following a string of poor results. He was appointed manager of his former club Lierse on 21 November 2006. When he arrived at the club, Lierse lay bottom of the table with only two points in fifteen matches. At the end of the season, they ended up with 26 points and avoided direct relegation. In the play-offs, Lierse only managed to win three of their six matches and were relegated to the Second Division after all.

1. FC Kaiserslautern
In May 2007, Rekdal signed on to manage Kaiserslautern in the German 2. Bundesliga. He left the club in early February of the following year, the club lying in sixteenth place.

Aalesund
He joined forces with Norwegian top flight outfit Aalesund in 2008 after moving back to Norway. Joining the club mid-season, he found Aalesund lying in a relegation spot, but managed to get a relegation play-off spot, where Aalesund beat challengers Sogndal 7–2 on aggregate, thereby securing a new season in the Tippeligaen. In 2009, he led Aalesund to the club's first victory in the Norwegian Cup, where they beat arch rivals Molde 3–2 after a penalty shootout in the final. In 2010, he led the club to the fourth place in Tippeligaen, the club's best result ever. In 2011, he received wide praise when his club came close to the historic feat of qualifying for the 2011–12 UEFA Europa League, losing the last play-off game to the Dutch side AZ Alkmaar, having won the first leg 2–1. The same year he again led Aalesund to win the Norwegian Cup Final, thereby securing a UEFA Europa League qualification spot for the third consecutive year. His contract with Aalesund was terminated on 26 November 2012.
After he won his second Norwegian Cup with Aalesund in three years, he was once again said to take over as national team coach after Drillo.

On 26 November 2012, the board of directors of Aalesund announced the termination of Rekdal's contract. The board stressed that it was not due to the season results, but rather as a result of a general review. Analysts noted that the sacking was likely a result of a power struggle within the club between Rekdal, the sports director and the chairman of the board.

Return to Vålerenga
Rekdal started his second tenure for Vålerenga, when he was appointed as head coach on 8 January 2013.

On 13 July 2016, it was announced he would end his tenure as head coach of Valerenga after the 2016 season and will move into the position as sporting director to make way for Ronny Deila whom will take over as head coach.

Start
Rekdal was appointed as head coach on 1 June 2018 after former head coach Mark Dempsey was sacked on 18 May 2018. Rekdal signed a two-year contract with Start.

Rekdal took over the team, after 12 games of the season had been played; during his spell, only six teams gathered more points, yet the team was relegated [at the end of that season].

That job ended; In an interview in 2020, he said that frequent visits to [places for betting/gambling or] one or more casinos, was not well-received by [his previous employer] Start.

Personal life
Born 6 November 1968 in Rekdal in Vestnes, into a family of six, including three younger siblings, his younger brother Sindre played also professional with Molde FK helping them win the domestic cup in 1994. Among his interests and hobbies is freshwater fishing and card-games such as Poker, having competed in amateur tournaments internationally.

Rekdal moved to Ottestad neighborhood in Hamar in 2013, with his wife and four children.

During his time at Lierse, Rekdal had a clause in his contract which allowed him to keep up to date with Leeds United results at half-time intervals, via BBC Radio. He is a fanatic supporter of the Yorkshire club.

Rekdal is highly superstitious. To avoid bad luck, he never appears on matchday without his locally produced trademark Pear-flavoured soft drink.

While coaching Aalesunds FK, he appeared in the home matches of tier five club Fiksdal/Rekdal as a player, stating that he wished to contribute to the club with which he started his career.

Career statistics
Scores and results list Norway's goal tally first, score column indicates score after each Rekdal goal.

Managerial statistics

Honours

As player
Molde
Norwegian Football Cup: 1994

Vålerenga
Norwegian Football Cup: 2002
Norwegian First Division: 2001

As Coach
Vålerenga
Eliteserien: 2005
Norwegian Football Cup: 2002
Norwegian First Division: 2001

Aalesund
Norwegian Football Cup: 2009, 2011

References

External links
 
 
 
 Official Profile and Statistics at fotball.no 

1968 births
Living people
People from Molde
People from Vestnes
Norwegian footballers
Norway youth international footballers
Norway under-21 international footballers
Norway international footballers
Kniksen Award winners
Molde FK players
Borussia Mönchengladbach players
Lierse S.K. players
Stade Rennais F.C. players
Hertha BSC players
Vålerenga Fotball players
Eliteserien players
Bundesliga players
Belgian Pro League players
Norwegian First Division players
Ligue 1 players
1994 FIFA World Cup players
1998 FIFA World Cup players
UEFA Euro 2000 players
Norwegian football managers
Vålerenga Fotball managers
Lierse S.K. managers
1. FC Kaiserslautern managers
Aalesunds FK managers
IK Start managers
Hamarkameratene managers
Rosenborg BK managers
Norwegian expatriate footballers
Expatriate footballers in Germany
Norwegian expatriate sportspeople in Germany
Expatriate footballers in Belgium
Norwegian expatriate sportspeople in Belgium
Expatriate footballers in France
Norwegian expatriate sportspeople in France
Norwegian expatriate football managers
Expatriate football managers in Belgium
Expatriate football managers in Germany
Association football midfielders
Eliteserien managers
Sportspeople from Møre og Romsdal